Cystodermella is a genus of fungi in the family Agaricaceae. The genus comprises about 12 species, noted for producing agaric fruit bodies, bearing a cap, white gills and stipe with a fine, ephemeral ring. The genus was devised by Harri Harmaja in 2002, dividing the older genus Cystoderma into three independent genera: Cystoderma, Ripartitella and Cystodermella largely on the basis of microscopic differences. Cystodermella species bear non-amyloid spores and sometimes cystidia. The spores, in contrast to Ripartitella are not echinulate.

Species of the genus have a saprotrophic mode of nutrition, and occur around the world.

Species

Cystodermella adnatifolia (Peck) Harmaja 2002
Cystodermella ambrosii (Bres.) Harmaja 2002
Cystodermella australis (A.H.Sm. & Singer) Vizzini 2008
Cystodermella cinnabarina (Alb. & Schwein.) Harmaja 2002 
Cystodermella contusifolia (Pegler) Harmaja 2002 
Cystodermella cristallifera  (Thoen) Harmaja 2002 
Cystodermella elegans (Beeli) Harmaja 2002
Cystodermella freirei (Justo & M.L.Castro) Vizzini 2008 
Cystodermella granulosa (Batsch) Harmaja 2002 – United Kingdom
Cystodermella japonica (Thoen & Hongo) Harmaja 2002
Cystodermella lactea Musumeci 2006
Cystodermella myriadocystis (Heinem. & Thoen) Harmaja 2002
Cystodermella papallactae (I.Saar & Læssøe) Vizzini 2008
Cystodermella subpurpurea  (A.H.Sm. & Singer) Harmaja 2002

See also
List of Agaricaceae genera
List of Agaricales genera

References
Footnotes

Citations

Agaricaceae
Agaricales genera